Czech Australians are Australian citizens of Czech ancestry. Most Czech immigrants to Australia came after World War II and 1968–1969. Most recently the biggest influx is of students coming to Australia to study English and to find work. Many of them are deciding to stay by gaining permanent residency. According to 2016 census figures, around 24,500 Australians identify as having Czech ancestry, mostly in Melbourne and Sydney. In the 1960s and 1970s, one of the most successful Australian soccer clubs was Sydney FC Prague.

Notable Czech Australians

See also

Czech diaspora
European Australians
Europeans in Oceania
Immigration to Australia

References

External links
 Czech Australian New Zealand Association
 Czech Australian Group

Australia
Immigration to Australia
European Australian
 *